Michael Henry Todd Jr. (October 8, 1929 – May 5, 2002) was an American film producer.  He was involved in innovations such as the movie format Smell-o-vision, and the production of a racially-integrated minstrel show for the 1964 World's Fair.

Early life
Todd was born to movie producer and cinema pioneer Mike Todd and his first wife, Bertha Freshman Todd. He was also a stepson of Elizabeth Taylor even though he was older than his famous stepmother through his father's third marriage.

Career
Todd was vice president of his father's company, Cinerama, and was responsible for filming the famous roller-coaster scene from the company's debut film, This is Cinerama (1952).  He is also known for introducing the short-lived movie format Smell-o-vision, used in the 1960 film Scent of Mystery, which he produced. It was re-released as Holiday in Spain without smells.

Following in his father's footsteps of producing attractions for World's Fairs, Todd Jr. produced a racially integrated minstrel show for the 1964 New York World's Fair, called "America, Be Seated". It closed after two performances.

Personal life and death
Todd was first married [1953–1972] to Sarah Jane Weaver, and they had six children: Cyrus, Susan, Sarah, Eliza Haselton, Daniel, and Oliver Todd. Later, then married [1972–2002] to Susan McCarthy, Todd had two more children: Del and James.

In 1983, Todd and his wife Susan McCarthy wrote a biography of Todd Sr. called A Valuable Property: The Life Story of Michael Todd.

On May 5, 2002, Michael Todd died in Ireland of lung cancer, at the age of 72, with all of his children and his second wife surviving him.

References

1929 births
2002 deaths
Film producers from California
People from Los Angeles
Deaths from lung cancer in the Republic of Ireland
20th-century American Jews
21st-century American Jews